Mitchell Stephens (born February 5, 1997) is a Canadian professional ice hockey centre for the Laval Rocket in the American Hockey League (AHL) while under contract to the Montreal Canadiens of the National Hockey League (NHL). Stephens was selected by the Tampa Bay Lightning in the second round (33rd overall) of the 2015 NHL Entry Draft. Stephens won back-to-back Stanley Cups with the Lightning in 2020 and 2021.

Early life
Stephens was born on February 5, 1997, in Peterborough, Ontario to parents Lee and Heather. He is the cousin of Owen Tippett of the Philadelphia Flyers.

Playing career

Amateur
Growing up in Peterborough, Stephens played in the Peterborough Minor Hockey Council’s AAA Petes program before joining the Toronto Marlboros of the Greater Toronto Hockey League. While playing with the Minor Midget AAA Toronto Marlboros, Stephens helped lead the team to a Kraft Cup title and Scotiabank GTHL Playoffs championship during the 2012–13 season. He reached this achievement by recording 44 goals and 84 points in 58 regular-season games. As a result of his play, Stephens was drafted eighth overall by the Saginaw Spirit in the 2013 Ontario Hockey League (OHL) Priority Selection draft.

Major junior career

His outstanding play with Saginaw was recognized when he was chosen to skate as a member of Canada Ontario at the 2014 World U-17 Hockey Challenge. During the 2014–15 season, Stephens was chosen to skate at the 2015 CHL/NHL Top Prospects Game.

In his final season with Saginaw  in 2015–16, Stephens made 43 appearances, tallying 22 goals and 19 assists, while being named team MVP. He missed a significant number of games due to a broken foot that season.

On April 4, 2016, Stephens penned a three-year entry-level contract with the Lightning and was sent to their American Hockey League (AHL) team, the Syracuse Crunch, on an amateur try-out contract. He subsequently made his professional debut with the Crunch on April 8, 2016. He finished the season with the Crunch, recording one goal in five games. Upon returning to the OHL for the 2016–17 season, Stephens was named captain of the Spirit with alternates Kris Bennett, C.J. Garcia, and Keaton Middleton. He remained captain of the team until January 2017 when he was traded to the London Knights in exchange for various draft picks. At the time of the trade, Stephens scored 62 goals to rank 14th all-time in franchise history. However, Stephens played only 29 regular season games with the Knights and 14 playoff games before returning to the Crunch.

Professional

On December 9, 2019, Stephens made his NHL debut in a 5–1 Lightning loss to the visiting New York Islanders at Amalie Arena. On December 28, 2019, Stephens recorded his first career NHL goal in 5–4 Lightning win over the Montreal Canadiens. On August 3, 2020, Stephens skated in his first career NHL playoff game. In that game Stephens also recorded his first career NHL playoff goal and point. As a result, he signed a two year contract extension to remain with the Lightning on October 7, 2020.

Detroit Red Wings 
On July 30, 2021, Stephens was traded to the Detroit Red Wings in exchange for a sixth-round pick in the 2022 NHL Entry Draft. While attending the Red Wings training camp, Stephens earned praise from coach Jeff Blashill for his skating ability and energy while projecting he would play on their fourth line.

Montreal Canadiens 
On July 13, 2022, Stephens signed a one-year, two-way contract with the Montreal Canadiens.

International play
Stephens competed as a member of Canada Ontario at the 2014 World U-17 Hockey Challenge. He was also invited to compete with the Canada men's national under-18 ice hockey team at the 2014 Ivan Hlinka Memorial Tournament where he helped Team Canada win gold. In April 2015, he captained the Canada men's national under-18 ice hockey team to a bronze medal as the 2015 IIHF World U18 Championships.

Career statistics

Regular season and playoffs

International

Awards and honours

References

External links

1997 births
Living people
Canadian ice hockey defencemen
Detroit Red Wings players
Ice hockey people from Ontario
Laval Rocket players
London Knights players
Sportspeople from Peterborough, Ontario
Saginaw Spirit players
Stanley Cup champions
Syracuse Crunch players
Tampa Bay Lightning draft picks
Tampa Bay Lightning players